Steven Michael Alatorre (born September 3, 1959) is a former Canadian football quarterback who played for the Montreal Concordes of the Canadian Football League (CFL).

Early years
Alatorre attended and played high school football at Cypress High School.

College career
Alatorre played college football at Cypress College from 1977–1979 before transferring to Tennessee, where he was the starting quarterback during  part of the 1980 season and the 1981 season.  During his two years at Tennessee, he completed 139 of 273 passes for 1,918 yards, 13 touchdowns, and 20 interceptions under head coach Johnny Majors. He led the Volunteers to a 28–21 win over Wisconsin in the 1981 Garden State Bowl, completing 24 of 42 passes for 315 yards and a touchdown, and winning the game's MVP honors. Alatorre's efforts in the 1981 season helped lead Tennessee to a 8–4 finish, which marked the most wins for the program since 1973.

Professional career
Alatorre played three regular season games for the Concordes. On 22 attempts, Alatorre passed for 114 yards, one touchdown, and one interception. Alatorre signed with the Saskatchewan Roughriders of the CFL in 1982 and was traded to the Montreal Concordes before the start of the regular season. Due to an injury to Ken Johnson, Alatorre started the first game of the 1982 season. However, he was replaced by Luc Tousignant to begin the second half.

See also
List of Tennessee Volunteers starting quarterbacks
List of Montreal Alouettes starting quarterbacks

References

External links
Pro Football Archives bio
Tennessee Volunteers bio

1959 births
Living people
Tennessee Volunteers football players
Saskatchewan Roughriders players
Montreal Concordes players
American football quarterbacks
Canadian football quarterbacks
Players of Canadian football from California
Players of American football from California
Sportspeople from Los Angeles County, California